The Virginia Tech Hokies football team represents Virginia Polytechnic Institute and State University in the sport of American football.  The Hokies compete in the Football Bowl Subdivision (FBS) of the National Collegiate Athletic Association (NCAA) and the Coastal Division of the Atlantic Coast Conference. They previously competed in the Big East. Their home games are played at Lane Stadium, located in Blacksburg, Virginia, with a seating capacity of over 65,000 fans. Lane Stadium is considered to be one of the loudest stadiums in the country, being voted number two in ESPN's 2007 "Top 20 Scariest Places to Play". It was also recognized in 2005 by Rivals.com as having the best home-field advantage in the country.

Since beginning football in 1892, the Hokies have won over 700 games and appeared in 33 bowl games, including the 2000 BCS National Championship game. The Hokies rank 23rd among all Division I college football teams for most wins. The program had a streak of 27 consecutive bowl appearances, starting with the 1993 Independence Bowl and lasting through the 2019 Belk Bowl. This was fourth-longest streak of consecutive bowl game appearances in college football history. The program has also claimed eleven conference titles (3 South Atlantic, 1 Southern, 3 Big East, and 4 ACC) and produced eight All-Americans.

History

Early history

Virginia Agricultural and Mechanical College (now Virginia Tech) first played football on October 21, 1892, against St. Albans Lutheran Boys School (Radford, Virginia). The game took place on a plowed off wheat field that was "about as level as a side of Brush Mountain". The Hokies won their first game 14–10, but were defeated 10–0 eight days later on a return trip to Radford. The first several VAMC teams wore cadet gray and black, but in 1896 the colors were changed to Burnt Orange and Chicago Maroon – a color combination that was unique among educational institutions at the time.

The 1899, 1901, and 1903 teams lost only to rival Virginia. Star player Hunter Carpenter returned to Virginia Tech in 1905, after a year at the University of North Carolina, for a last shot at beating Virginia. Carpenter helped lead VPI to a 9–1 record, the best in school's history up to that time. He was never named to the All-America team only because Walter Camp, who named the team at the time, said he would never name a player who he had not seen play.

The 1909 team claim a southern championship. This is the first season the team was referred to in print as the "Gobblers,” which became the official nickname in 1912.

SAIAA years (1912–1921)
At the end of the 1911 season, VPI joined the South Atlantic Intercollegiate Athletic Association (SAIAA). They won the conference in 1916 and 1918. After 1921, the SAIAA was dissolved and six of its schools became founding members of the Southern Conference.

SoCon years (1922–1964)
From 1925 to 1928, Tech was led by Frank Peake and the "Pony Express" backfield. He was joined by Scotty MacArthur, Herbert "Mac" McEver and Tommy Tomko.  In 1927, during a 6–0 upset of the Colgate Red Raiders in New York, Peake ran for nearly 200 yards and scored the game's only points. During one three-game stretch, he accumulated rushing and return yardage of 306, 314 and 353 yards. He was credited with gaining 1,761 yards in eight games. 930 were from scrimmage, and 831 on punts and kickoffs. In 1928 the game against Virginia he came off the sideline with an injured hip to return a punt for a touchdown.

In 1932, Tech upset Georgia 7–6. Bill Grinus blocked the tying extra point.

Virginia Tech's first post-season bowl appearance was in the 1947 Sun Bowl in El Paso, Texas, against the University of Cincinnati. Tech had a 3–3–3 record that year, and was the third choice after Border Conference champions Hardin–Simmons University and runner-up Texas Tech Red Raiders both declined the bowl invitation. Tech lost that game 18–6.

Another first for the Gobblers came in 1954 when they had their first, and only, unbeaten season in school history. The team was 8–0–1 and finished ranked 16th in the Associated Press post-season football poll. The team's lone blemish was a 7–7 tie against William & Mary in Blacksburg, Virginia. Despite the team's success, it did not appear in a post-season bowl game. The 1963 team captured Tech's only outright SoCon championship.

1970s

In the 1970s, Tech briefly adopted an aggressive passing offense under head coach Charlie Coffey; quarterback Don Strock set virtually every passing record in the Hokies' book and would hold many for 30 years or more.  Success, though, remained elusive.

Bill Dooley era (1978–1986) 
In the early 1980s, football coach and athletic director, Bill Dooley spearheaded a campaign for a new look and name for the mascot, which debuted at the 1981 football game against Wake Forest.  The turkey-like figure was referred to as "the Hokie mascot", "the Hokie", and "the Hokie bird" (derived from the "Old Hokie" cheer), which resulted in changing the official designation of the Virginia Tech mascot to the Hokies. Dooley led the Hokies to the program's first-ever bowl win, in the 1986 Peach Bowl over NC State, but he also earned the program NCAA sanctions that led to his resignation that very offseason (after which he promptly sued the school).

Frank Beamer era (1987–2015) 
Though many hoped for recently departed Maryland coach Bobby Ross, athletic director Dutch Baughman turned to Frank Beamer, a Hokie alumnus and defensive back from 1966 to 1968. Beamer had worked his way up the assistant coaching ladder since his 1969 graduation before spending six seasons in the head job at Murray State.  Among the assistants Beamer brought with him from the Racers was linebackers coach Bud Foster, who had joined Beamer's first Murray State staff as a graduate assistant immediately upon his own graduation there.

Virginia Tech joined the Big East Conference for football play in 1991 (later joined for all sports in 2000). The Hokies were competitive in the new league early on, but could never beat annual foe, the Miami Hurricanes, despite having a 6-6 record vs. the Hurricanes during the Big East years. In 1993, the Hokies earned a trip to the Independence Bowl in Shreveport, Louisiana, its first bowl game under Beamer. With a win in that game, the Hokies notched only the fourth nine-win season in school history at the time. It became the first of 23 straight bowl games under Beamer, until he retired in 2015.

1995 season
After finally beating the Hurricanes during the 1995 regular season, the 13th ranked Hokies clinched a berth in the Sugar Bowl in New Orleans, Louisiana–the program's first appearance in a major bowl game. They the 9th ranked Texas Longhorns 28-10. This was a signature win for the Hokies, capping the most successful season to date; it became turning point for the program as a whole.

1999 season
Virginia Tech's most successful football season was in 1999 under the guidance of redshirt freshman quarterback, Michael Vick. Among other amazing moments, on November 3, the Hokies came from behind on the road, to win against the West Virginia Mountaineers. Vick led a desperate last minute drive that culminated in a dramatic Shayne Graham game-winning field goal. The 22–20 victory has since become known as the "Miracle in Morgantown." The team completed the year with its first ever undefeated regular season, finishing with an (11–0) record. On January 4, 2000, the Hokies faced the Florida State Seminoles in the 2000 Sugar Bowl for the national championship. A back and forth game, the Hokies trailed 28–7 late in the second quarter but came back to take a 29–28 lead at the start of the fourth. However, they were not able to hold on and the Seminoles won 46–29. The Hokies finished third in the AP Poll and second in the Coaches Poll–in both cases, the highest final ranking in school history and the highest ever for a Division I team from the Commonwealth.

The following season, in 2000, the Hokies were again contenders for the national championship, but a loss to No. 3 Miami in early November, in a game in which Michael Vick was limited because of an injury, cost them a trip to the Orange Bowl. The Hokies later went on to defeat the Clemson Tigers 41–20 in the 2001 Gator Bowl in Jacksonville, Florida.

At the start of the 2004 season, the Hokies faced the No. 1 and eventual national champion USC Trojans in the BCA Classic played at FedExField in Landover, Maryland. The Hokies kept the game close, but eventually lost 24–13. The regular season ended with the Hokies winning the ACC championship in their first year in the conference and a return to the Sugar Bowl and a match-up with the Auburn Tigers. Auburn, the SEC champion and one of three undefeated teams (USC and Oklahoma being the other two), took a 16–0 lead into the fourth quarter. Led by senior quarterback Bryan Randall, the Hokies scored 13 points but fell just short of the comeback when the Tigers recovered an onside kick and ran out the clock.

The 2005 season saw many ups and downs, but would end in disappointment. Taking over for Bryan Randall was Marcus Vick, younger brother of Hokies great Michael Vick. The Hokies started off the season 8–0, including victories over West Virginia and ACC rivals Georgia Tech and Boston College. Going into the tenth week of the season, the Hokies were ranked 3rd in the country behind USC and Texas and would face the 5th ranked Miami Hurricanes at home. In anticipation of the match-up, ESPN's College Gameday would broadcast the game nationally from Blacksburg on ESPN. The Hurricanes controlled the game and limited Marcus Vick to only 90 yards passing to win 27–7.

Marcus Vick led the Hokies and went on to win the ACC Coastal Division title, but lost in the ACC Championship Game to Florida State. The Hokies again trailed the Seminoles by double digits at halftime, 27–3, but a Vick led comeback brought the score to 27–22 with 1:45 left in the fourth quarter. The Hokies were unable to recover the onside kick and lost their chance at a BCS Bowl berth.

The Hokies closed the season against the upstart Louisville Cardinals in the 2006 Gator Bowl. Virginia Tech won 35–24, but the game would become infamous for a play that would contribute to Vick's expulsion from the team. Late in the first half, with the Hokies trailing 17–10, Vick was tackled by Cardinals defensive end Elvis Dumervil. After the play, Vick stomped on Dumervil's leg, apparently out of anger. Four days after the game, Virginia Tech officials learned of two misdemeanor charges of speeding and driving on a suspended or revoked driver's license that Vick received on December 17, 2005. Vick, who was forced to sit out the 2004 football season by the university due to previous legal incidents in his college career, was dismissed from the team on January 6, 2006, with the university citing "a cumulative effect of legal infractions and unsportsmanlike play.".

Redshirt sophomore quarterback Sean Glennon was set to take over for Vick in the 2006 season. Although consecutive losses to Georgia Tech and Boston College knocked the Hokies out of contention for the ACC Championship Game, the Tech team finished the season strong, winning six in a row and being invited to the 2006 Chick-fil-A Bowl in Atlanta. In the annual ACC vs SEC match-up, the Hokies played the Georgia Bulldogs. At halftime the Hokies led 21–3, but four second half Glennon turnovers helped the Bulldogs in coming back and winning 31–24.

After the April 2007 Virginia Tech shootings that stunned the campus and nation, the remainder of Tech's spring practice was canceled. The Hokies, led by running back Brandon Ore on offense and linebackers Vince Hall and Xavier Adibi looked to be in contention for a berth in the National Championship. The 2007 home opener against the East Carolina Pirates was the subject of College GameDay, and the Hokies prevailed in an emotional, albeit shaky, game 17–7. They then traveled to Baton Rouge, Louisiana, to play the LSU Tigers. In a game that saw Glennon replaced by true freshman quarterback Tyrod Taylor, the Hokies were completely dominated, only managing 149 total yards against the Tigers' 598. Taylor scored the only touchdown of the night after an 8-play, 65-yard drive.

Taylor continued to start until an injury removed him from a 43–14 blowout of Duke. In a Thursday night match-up with Boston College, Glennon reclaimed his starting position. In a game plagued by rain storms and wet conditions, the Hokies took a 10–0 lead late into the fourth quarter. However, Eagles quarterback Matt Ryan spurred a late Boston College comeback, leading two TD drives in the final five minutes for a 14–10 win.  Despite the devastating loss, Virginia Tech rebounded to win the remainder of its regular season games and claim the Coastal Division crown.  A rematch with Boston College in the ACC Championship Game saw Tech fall behind early, tie the game by halftime, and then grind out a tense 30–16 win to advance to the Orange Bowl in Miami.

After 29 seasons as head coach of Virginia Tech, legendary coach Frank Beamer retired following the conclusion of the 2015 season.  He coached the Hokies to 23 consecutive bowl games, including a national championship appearance, along with seven conference championship titles. Beamer signed an 8-year contract with Virginia Tech, serving as an ambassador for the Athletic Department.

During Beamer's tenure at Virginia Tech, putting points on the scoreboard became a full team effort with the offensive, defensive and special teams units. Often when the team scores one or more non-offensive touchdowns, the style of play is described as "Beamerball". Since Beamer's first season in 1987, a player at every position on the defensive unit has scored at least one touchdown, and 35 different players have scored touchdowns on Virginia Tech's special teams.

Sometime before the 1995 season, defensive coordinator Bud Foster wanted to give his defense something to rally around, an identity. A battered metal lunch pail was chosen as a symbol of a no-name, blue-collar defense. Each week a list of goals in put in the lunch pail and a player is chosen to have the honor of carrying the lunch pail onto the sidelines. The Lunch Pail Defense Foundation was founded to fund academic scholarships for students from the area near Blacksburg, Virginia.

Justin Fuente era (2016–2021)
On November 27, 2015, former Memphis Head Coach, Justin Fuente was named the new head coach of the Virginia Tech Hokies. Fuente took over the team from the retiring, legendary coach Frank Beamer, following the 2015 Independence Bowl game.

The Hokies finished Fuente's first year in 2016 with a regular season record of 9-3 and an overall record of 10-4. The Hokies became Coastal Division Champions for the 6th time and the first time since 2011. The Hokies played Clemson in the ACC Championship Game, losing 42-35. The team went to the 2016 Belk Bowl, in Charlotte, NC, defeating Arkansas, 35-24. Fuente was named the 2016 ACC Coach of the Year and he received many other accolades for the 2016 season.

Fuente was fired with two regular season games remaining on November 16, 2021, after compiling an overall record of 43-31 in six seasons.

Brent Pry era (2021–present)
On November 30, 2021, the Hokies hired Penn State defensive coordinator and linebackers coach Brent Pry as the new head coach.

Conference affiliations 
 Independent (1892–1897)
 Southern Intercollegiate Athletic Association (1898)
 Independent (1899–1911)
 South Atlantic Intercollegiate Athletic Association (1912–1921)
 Southern Conference (1922–1964)
 Independent (1965–1990)
 Big East (1991–2003)
 ACC (2004–present)

Head coaches

Championships

Conference championships
Virginia Tech claims 11 conference championships.

† Co-champions

Division championships
Virginia Tech won the ACC Championship in its inaugural season in the league in 2004. In 2005, the ACC Conference created two divisions, the Atlantic and Coastal, and a championship game between the divisions was established. Virginia Tech has appeared in the ACC Championship Game as the winner of the Coastal Division six times. Virginia Tech won the Coastal division in 2005 and played Florida State in the ACC Championship. Florida State won, 27-22. During the 2007 season, the Hokies once again took the Coastal division to set up a rematch of their earlier loss to Boston College.  Virginia Tech prevailed 30–16.  History repeated itself in 2008, when the Hokies defeated Boston College by a score of 30–12 after having lost to the Eagles during the regular season.  In 2010 Virginia Tech went undefeated in league play, defeating Atlantic Division winner Florida State in the league championship game in Charlotte, North Carolina, 44–33. In 2011 Virginia Tech lost to Clemson for a 2nd time that season, their only two season losses. In 2016, Virginia Tech would fall short to Clemson, making a 3rd loss.

† Co-champions

Bowl games

Virginia Tech has played in 34 bowl games. The Hokies have appeared in several Gator, Peach, Sugar, Belk, Military and Orange bowls. Their overall record in bowl games is 13–21 through the 2021 season.

Rivalries

Virginia 

Virginia Tech and Virginia first met in 1895 and have played annually since the year 1970. Since 1964, the game has always been played at either Lane Stadium or Scott Stadium on the campuses of the two universities. But the series has at times been played in Richmond (1903, 1904, and 1957); Norfolk (1940, 1941, and 1942); and Roanoke (in 17 of the 19 years between 1945 and 1963). At 97 games, it is the longest series for the Hokies and second-longest for the Cavaliers, after the 118 game series between Virginia and North Carolina known as the South's Oldest Rivalry. The game counts for 1 point in the Commonwealth Clash each year, and is part of the greater Virginia–Virginia Tech rivalry.

Virginia Tech leads in the Commonwealth Cup series 17–3 and the football series 58–38–5 as of 2019. Three times this game has determined the Coastal Division champions with VT winning in 2007 and 2011, and UVA winning in 2019.

West Virginia 

The Hokies and West Virginia Mountaineers met 51 times between 1912 and 2005. The two teams played as conference foes from 1991 to 2003 as members of the Big East Conference (1979–2013). They met every year from 1973 to 2005. The Black Diamond Trophy is the trophy that goes to the winner of the game. It was introduced in 1997 and was meant to symbolize the Appalachian region's rich coal heritage (the phrase "black diamond" is often used as a term for coal.) Virginia Tech held the trophy in six of the nine years in which it was contested. The last two games played where on September 18, 2021, in Morgantown with West Virginia winning 27–21, and September 22, 2022, in Blacksburg with West Virginia winning 33–10. There are no further games scheduled in the series after the 2022 season.

West Virginia leads the series 30–23–1 as of 2022.

Miami 

The Hurricanes and Hokies first met on November 13, 1953, in Miami. Miami and Virginia Tech have met in two bowl games, the 1966 Liberty Bowl and 1981 Peach Bowl. The two teams have played annually since 1992, and the rivalry developed when the Hokies became a member of the Big East Conference for football in 1991. When the Atlantic Coast Conference (ACC) expanded in 2004, both Miami and Virginia Tech became members of the ACC. Both teams continue to compete annually as part of the ACC's Coastal Division.

Miami leads the series 22–15 as of 2022. The last game between the two teams was October 15, 2022, in Blacksburg, and Miami won 20–14.

The two teams will next play during a yet to specified date in the 2025 season at Miami's home stadium, Hard Rock Stadium in Miami Gardens.

Georgia Tech 

One of the Hokies' younger rivals is Georgia Tech. Prior to the Hokies joining the ACC in 2004, Virginia Tech and Georgia Tech had only met once previously (an additional scheduled meeting was canceled due to extreme weather). Since the ACC adopted divisional format for football, one of these two teams had represented the ACC Coastal Division in every ACC Championship Game except the 2013 season when Duke won the Coastal and 2015 when UNC won it. Over the years, the rivalry has become a significant annual matchup in the ACC, specifically when both teams are in both regularly in the AP Top 25 and the race for the Coastal Division championship.

Virginia Tech leads the series 10–7 as of 2019, with Virginia Tech winning the past meeting.

Boston College 

The Boston College-Virginia Tech football rivalry began in 1993 with a 48–34 Boston College win in Chestnut Hill when the two teams began Big East conference round-robin play. When the two schools moved to the Atlantic Coast Conference the rivalry continued as the two schools were chosen as permanent cross-divisional rivals. The teams played twice in both the 2007 and 2008 seasons, as both teams won their respective divisions of the ACC and played each other in the conference championship. Although the Eagles defeated the Hokies in both the regular seasons those two years, Virginia Tech won the 2007 and 2008 ACC Championship Game played between the two schools.

Virginia Tech leads the series 19–10 as of 2020, with Virginia Tech winning the past meeting.

VMI 

Virginia Tech and VMI first met in 1894 and played annually from 1913 to 1971, usually in Roanoke on Thanksgiving Day. Like the current rivalry between VMI and The Citadel, the match-up was referred to as the Military Classic of the South, due to the military heritage of both schools. Starting again in 1973, the teams would continue to play on a yearly basis, making multiple appearances together in the Tobacco Bowl (1974, 1976) and Oyster Bowl (1980, 1982, 1984). The 1984 Oyster Bowl is the last time they played each other. However, in 2017, Virginia Tech and VMI agreed to a one-time rivalry matchup on September 5, 2026, at Lane Stadium. At 79 games, it is the second-longest series for the Hokies and fourth-longest for the Keydets. Due to the long pause of the VMI-VPI series, the Virginia–Virginia Tech rivalry has emerged as the dominant one in the state. Virginia Tech leads the series 49-25-5 as of 2019, with Virginia Tech winning the past six meetings.

Individual award winners

Players
Sammy Baugh Trophy (quarterback)
Don Strock – 1972
Bronko Nagurski Trophy (defense)
Corey Moore – 1999
Dave Rimington Trophy (center)
Jake Grove – 2003
Lombardi Award (lineman or linebacker)
Corey Moore – 1999
Outland Trophy (interior lineman)
Bruce Smith – 1984

Coaches
Paul "Bear" Bryant Award
Frank Beamer – 1999

George Munger Award
Frank Beamer – 1999

Joseph V. Paterno Award
Frank Beamer – 2010

Broyles Award (assistant coaches)
Bud Foster – 2006

Bobby Dodd Coach of the Year Award
 Frank Beamer 1999

Future opponents
Announced opponents as of October 22, 2021.

 The 2024 game with Vanderbilt will be played at Nissan Stadium in Nashville, TN.
 The 2025 game with South Carolina will be played at Mercedes-Benz Stadium in Atlanta, GA.

Further reading

 Beamer, Frank and Colston, Chris. Turn up the Wick.  223 pages.  Epic Sports: 2000. .
 Easterbrook, Gregg. The King of Sports: Football's Impact on America. 354 pages.  St. Martin's: 2013. .
 Schlabach, Mark. What it Means to be a Hokie. 272 pages.  Triumph Books: 2006.  .

References

External links

 

 
American football teams established in 1892
1892 establishments in Virginia